Dayu Kandi (also Romanized as Dāyū Kandī; also known as Dāyū, Tai, and Tay) is a village in Khvoresh Rostam-e Shomali Rural District, Khvoresh Rostam District, Khalkhal County, Ardabil Province, Iran. At the 2006 census, its population was 78, in 24 families.

References 

Towns and villages in Khalkhal County